The Denton County Transportation Authority (DCTA) is the transit authority that operates in Denton County, Texas. It operates transit service in three cities within Denton County, as well as the A-train, a regional commuter rail line to Carrollton.

History 
DCTA was created in accordance with House Bill 3323, under Chapter 460 of the Texas Transportation Code, approved by the 77th Texas Legislature and signed into law by the Governor in 2001. On November 5, 2002, the voters in Denton County approved the confirmation of DCTA by 73%. The DCTA Board of Directors represents every geographic area of the county.

In 2006, DCTA absorbed LINK, the mass transit service operated by the City of Denton since 2002. LINK's bus routes were absorbed into DCTA's local Denton services (now called Connect). Paratransit services in the three member cities were also absorbed and renamed DCTA Access.  Neither Lewisville nor Highland Village (the other current members of DCTA) operated bus lines prior to DCTA's formation.

Member cities 
The following cities voted to join the DCTA on September 13, 2003 and levy a half cent sales tax to finance the system.

Denton
Highland Village
Lewisville

No other cities have joined the DCTA since its inception, and none of the original cities have elected to withdraw.

Board of directors 
The Denton County Transportation Authority is governed by a 14-member board appointed by respective entities:

Three members are appointed by "small cities" (population ≤ 17,000)
Eight members are appointed by "large cities" (population > 17,000)
Two members are appointed from unincorporated areas of the county
One member represents the county at-large

Although a DCTA Board member must reside in Denton County, the member does not have to reside in a DCTA-member city.

All members serve two-year terms. Board members must have professional experience in the field of transportation, business, government, engineering or law. In accordance with DCTA By-laws, the Board adopts the annual operating budget and is responsible for setting policy. The president oversees the day-to-day operations of the DCTA and implements policies set forth by the Board.

Transportation services 
The Denton County Transportation Authority offers several services to the general public in and around Denton, Lewisville, and Highland Village. These services include fixed-route service in Denton, an on-demand service in Highland Village and Lewisville, shuttle routes serving UNT, a regional commuter bus service connecting Denton and downtown Fort Worth, and a train service connecting Denton, Lewisville, Carrollton, and downtown Dallas. Additionally, DCTA offers paratransit service throughout its service area.

Connect 

DCTA Connect is the brand used on bus service in the city of Denton.  Three fixed routes operate around Denton and six shuttle routes provide service from various points in and around Denton to the University of North Texas campus.  (Texas Woman's University is served by regular service.)

GoZone 
GoZone is an on-demand public transit service operating in Denton, Lewisville, and Highland Village. The service offers shared van trips that increase the coverage of DCTA's overall network, and has replaced fixed-route service in Lewisville. GoZone launched in September 2021 in partnership with TransitTech provider Via Transportation.

Access 
DCTA offers curb to curb ADA paratransit service in Denton and Lewisville and demand-response (Non-ADA) service in Lewisville, Highland Village, and Denton for disabled and elderly (65 years and older) patrons.

ADA Paratransit service is provided within three-quarters of a mile on either side of the Connect local fixed routes in Lewisville and Denton. All other trips within the service area are classified as Non-ADA. Non-ADA demand response trips are provided on a first-come, first-served basis and are subject to capacity constraints.

A-train 

DCTA operates the A-train, a regional passenger rail line connecting Carrollton and Denton, to meet growing transportation demands in eastern Denton County. The A-train parallels Interstate 35E and is a logical extension with the Dallas Area Rapid Transit Green Line at Trinity Mills Station in Carrollton.

It has five stations, two in Denton and three in Lewisville, and opened June 20, 2011.

Partner services 
Alongside its regular service, DCTA manages or operates some services in partnership with other cities and agencies located in adjacent Collin County:

 Collin County Transit – On-demand service in McKinney, Texas
 Frisco, Texas – Para- and ADA-transit service and on-demand ridehail and potential driverless vehicle service pilot

Ridership 
DCTA ridership fluctuates greatly with the academic calendar, as a considerable portion of passengers are UNT and TWU students, faculty, and staff.  Bus ridership greatly exceeds rail ridership, primarily driven by university students.  For 2020, the agency reported 1.36 million bus trips alongside 221,316 rail trips.  Like many transit agencies across the world, DCTA's ridership was greatly impacted by the effects of the [COVID-19 pandemic].  Ridership in 2019 was 2.4 million bus trips and 393,400 rail trips, for comparison.

See also 

SPAN
NCTCOG
DART

References

External links 
 Denton County Transportation Authority
 RailDCTA
 UNT Parking & Transportation

 
Transportation in Texas
Bus transportation in Texas
Transportation in Denton County, Texas